Saint Leo the Great Church is a Roman Catholic church in the St. Leo's neighborhood of San Jose, California. Founded in 1923, it is a territorial parish of the Roman Catholic Diocese of San Jose in California and named for Pope Leo I, a Doctor of the Church.

History 

The second church replaced the original building in 1953
The first church was built in 1926 as seen in this photo taken by John C. Gordon in 1931.

The second church replaced the original building in 1953

School
St. Leo the Great Parish operates Saint Leo the Great School that  serves families of the Diocese of San Jose, from PreKindergarten to eighth grade. The namesake of the surrounding St. Leo's neighborhood of San Jose, California is named after the school which was established in 1915 by the Sisters of Notre Dame.

Description
The church has 2 organs.  A 300 pipe organ in the choir loft and a smaller Yamaha US1-C at the front of the church.

See also
 Roman Catholic Diocese of San Jose in California

References

External links

 St Leo the Great Parish
 St Leo the Great School
 Institute for the Incarnate Word
 300 pipe organ being played at St Leo the Great Parish in  2010
 300 pipe organ in choir loft at St Leo the Great Parish in 2008

Roman Catholic Diocese of San Jose in California
Leo the Great, Saint
Christian organizations established in 1921
1921 establishments in California